5083 may refer to:
The year in the 6th millennium
5083 aluminium alloy
5083 Irinara, an asteroid
A South Australian postcode for Broadview, South Australia and adjacent areas